The 1983 Rutgers Scarlet Knights football team represented Rutgers University in the 1983 NCAA Division I-A football season. In their 11th and final season under head coach Frank R. Burns, the Scarlet Knights compiled a 3–8 record while competing as an independent and were outscored by their opponents 258 to 195. The team's statistical leaders included Jacque LaPrarie with 1,275 passing yards, Albert Smith with 572 rushing yards, and Andrew Baker with 857 receiving yards.

Schedule

Roster

References

Rutgers
Rutgers Scarlet Knights football seasons
Rutgers Scarlet Knights football